Kinect Sesame Street TV is a Sesame Street video game of an interactive television program for the Microsoft Windows & Xbox 360 consoles. It is based on the children's television series of the same name and is aimed at children. Because of its motion gesture features, the game requires the Xbox 360's Kinect sensor to get into action. It is developed by Microsoft Studios' Soho Productions & published by Microsoft Studios. This interactive television program was released on 18 September 2012.

Gameplay
The game requires the Kinect peripheral to play. It allows players to use motion gestures and voice commands.

The game is compatible with the Xbox SmartGlass.

References

2012 video games
Kinect games
Microsoft games
Warner Bros. video games
Sesame Street video games
Video games developed in the United Kingdom
Windows games
Xbox 360 games
Children's educational video games

Single-player video games
Video games using Havok
North America-exclusive video games